Foxi may refer to:

Entertainment
 Fix and Foxi, a German comics magazine
 Fix & Foxi (TV channel), a German children's entertainment brand
 Fix & Foxi and Friends, an animated adaption of Rolf Kauka's comic series Fix & Foxi

People
 Foxi Kéthévoama (born 1986), Central African footballer
 Xiong Foxi (1900–1965), Chinese playwright

Species
 Adelophis foxi, a species of oviparous colubrid snake known as Fox's mountain meadow snake
 Crocidura foxi, a species of mammal known as Fox's shrew
 Dasymys foxi, a species of rodent known as Fox's shaggy rat
 Fukomys foxi, a species of rodent known as Nigerian mole-rat
 Glenognatha foxi, a species of long-jawed orb weaver
 Melanoplus foxi, a species of spur-throated grasshopper
 Metepeira foxi, a species of orb weaver
 Omosarotes foxi, a species of beetle
 Osmia foxi, a species of mason bees
 Parectypodus foxi, a species that is part of the Parectypodus genus
 Pepsis foxi, a species that is part of the Pepsis genus
 Prionyx foxi, a species of thread-waisted wasp
 Prochetodon foxi, a species that is part of the Prochetodon genus
 Stizoides foxi, a species of sand wasp
 Vullietoliva foxi, a species of sea snail

Other uses
 Buddha-like mindset (pronounced foxi), a term used by Chinese youth to describe people the rejection of the rat race in favour of a tranquil, apathetic life
 FOXI3, a protein

See also
 Fox
Foxie, a 1983 album by Bob James 
 Foxy (disambiguation)